Playa Conchas Chinas is a beach in Puerto Vallarta, in the Mexican state of Jalisco.

Fodor's says, "Frequented mainly by visitors staying in the area, this beach has a series of rocky coves with crystalline water. Millions of tiny white shells, broken and polished by the waves, form the sand; rocks that resemble petrified cow pies jut into the sea, separating one patch of beach from the next."

Lonely Planet describes Playa Conchas Chinas is "a tiny cove favored by families for the shallow and sheltered pools created by the burly rock reef further out" and says, "Although the cove is small, the beach is blond and reasonably wide, with lifeguards on duty."

References

External links

Beaches of Jalisco
Puerto Vallarta